The Boss and the Worker is a 1975 Italian comedy film directed by Steno.

Plot    
Gianluca Tosi, owner of a tap factory, is exhausted: the management of the company is an overwhelming task. Both his wife and his mistress have exhausted him. He has run out of energy. One of his workers, Luigi Carminati, is instead a fury: a monster of sexual vigor that has enormous success with women.

Cast 
Renato Pozzetto:Gianluca Tosi
Teo Teocoli: Luigi Carminati
Francesca Romana Coluzzi: Maria Luce Balestrazzi 
Gillian Bray: Silvana 
Gianfranco Barra: Vismara 
Loris Zanchi: Commendator Balestrazzi 
Guido Nicheli: Guido
Walter Valdi: Bauer lo psichiatra
Loredana Bertè: Maria Grazia Marigotti
Anna Maria Rizzoli: Violante

See also     
 List of Italian films of 1975

References

External links

1975 films
Italian comedy films
1975 comedy films
Films directed by Stefano Vanzina
Films about businesspeople
Films scored by Gianni Ferrio
Films with screenplays by Sergio Donati
Films with screenplays by Luciano Vincenzoni
Adultery in films
1970s Italian-language films
1970s Italian films